Julius Schultz (25 September 1888 – 8 July 1966) was an Australian cricketer. He played in four first-class matches for South Australia between 1919 and 1922.

See also
 List of South Australian representative cricketers

References

External links
 

1888 births
1966 deaths
Australian cricketers
South Australia cricketers
Cricketers from Adelaide